Dmitri Aleksandrovich Zhdanov (born 28 March 1977 in Moscow) is a former Russian football player.

References

1977 births
Footballers from Moscow
Living people
Russian footballers
Association football midfielders
FC Shinnik Yaroslavl players
Russian Premier League players